Zahi Abass Hawass (born May 28, 1947) is an Egyptian archaeologist, Egyptologist, and former Minister of State for Antiquities Affairs, serving twice. He has also worked at archaeological sites in the Nile Delta, the Western Desert, and the Upper Nile Valley،got it Order of the Rising Sun.

Early life
Hawass was born in a small village near Damietta, Egypt. Although he originally dreamed of becoming an attorney, he obtained a Bachelor of Arts degree in Greek and Roman Archaeology from Alexandria University in 1967. In 1979, Hawass earned a diploma in Egyptology from Cairo University. He then worked at the Great Pyramids as an inspector—a combination of administrator and archaeologist.

When he was 33 years old, Hawass was awarded a Fulbright Fellowship to attend the University of Pennsylvania in Philadelphia to study Egyptology, earning a Master of Arts degree in the subject and also one in Syro-Palestinian Archaeology in 1983, and his PhD in Egyptology in 1987 from the Graduate Group in the Art and Archaeology of the Mediterranean World (AAMW), concentrating on "The Funerary Establishments of Khufu, Khafra and Menkaura During the Old Kingdom."

He is often mistaken for being a Coptic Christian because of his name, even though he is a Muslim.

Career

Archaeology and early government career 
Hawass was Associate Director of Excavation at Hermopolis in 1968 and Tarrana 1970–74. Since 1975 he has been Excavation Director and Restoration Director at various sites throughout Egypt, predominantly Giza.

From 1969 to 1975, Hawass was Inspector of Antiquities for a multitude of archaeological expeditions, for instance the Yale Expedition at Abydos, Egypt in 1969, and Abu Simbel between 1972 and 1974.

He sporadically taught Egyptian archaeology, history and culture at universities in Egypt and the USA between 1988 and 2001, most notably at the American University in Cairo, the University of California, Los Angeles and Alexandria University. Hawass has described his efforts as trying to help institute a systematic program for the preservation and restoration of historical monuments, while training Egyptians to improve their expertise on methods of excavation, retrieval and preservation.

Giza 

Hawass was Inspector of Antiquities for Giza 1972–74, First Inspector until 1979 and Chief Inspector in 1980.

Starting in 1987 he held the position of "Director General of the Giza monuments", which includes the sites of Giza, Saqqara, Memphis, Dahshur, Abusir and Bahariya Oasis.

After the discovery of Gantenbrink's Door in 1993, he left the position –  according to Hawass, a resignation – but was reinstated several months later, following a change in leadership and the transformation of the "Egyptian Antiquities Organization" into the Supreme Council of Antiquities.

He was promoted to "Undersecretary of the State for the Giza Monuments" in 1998.

Hawass continues to be involved in archaeological projects at Giza and other sites in Egypt. Currently, he heads the science committee overseeing the Scanpyramids project.

Politics 
In 2002 Hawass was appointed as the Secretary General of the Supreme Council of Antiquities. When US President Barack Obama visited Cairo in June 2009, Hawass gave him personal tours of ancient Egyptian archaeological sites. Facing mandatory retirement, he was promoted by President Hosni Mubarak to the post of Vice Minister of Culture at the end of 2009.

2011 protest vandalism
On January 29, 2011, in the midst of the Egyptian protests of that year, Hawass arrived at the Egyptian Museum in Cairo to find that a number of cases had been broken into and a number of antiquities damaged, so police were brought in to secure the museum. According to Andrew Lawler, reporting for Science, Hawass said that he "faxed a colleague in Italy that 13 cases were destroyed. My heart is broken and my blood is boiling".

Hawass later told The New York Times that thieves looking for gold broke 70 objects, including two sculptures of the pharaoh Tutankhamun, and took two skulls from a research lab, before being stopped as they left the museum.

Minister of Antiquities
Hawass was appointed to the position of Minister of State for Antiquities Affairs, a newly created cabinet post, by Mubarak on January 31, 2011, as part of a cabinet shake-up during the 2011 protests. A press release including a statement from Hawass stated that he "will continue excavating, writing books, and representing his country," ensuring that archaeological sites in Egypt were being safeguarded and looted objects returned. Regarding the Egyptian Museum looting, he said that "The museum was dark and the nine robbers did not recognise the value of what was in the vitrines. They opened thirteen cases, threw the seventy objects on the ground and broke them, including one Tutankhamun case, from which they broke the statue of the king on a panther. However, the broken objects can all be restored, and we will begin the restoration process this week." Hawass rejected comparisons with the looting of antiquities in Iraq and Afghanistan.

On February 13, Mahmoud Kassem of Bloomberg reported Hawass as saying that "18 artifacts, including statues of King Tutankhamun," were stolen from the Egyptian Museum in January; Kassem, paraphrasing Hawass, continues, "The missing objects include 11 wooden shabti statuettes from Yuya, a gilded wooden statue of Tutankhamun carried by a goddess and a statue of Nefertiti making offerings."

Egyptian state television reported that Hawass called upon Egyptians not to believe the “lies and fabrications” of the Al Jazeera and Al Arabiya satellite television channels. Hawass later said “They should give us the opportunity to change things, and if nothing happens they can march again. But you can’t bring in a new president now, in this time. We need Mubarak to stay and make the transition.” On March 3, 2011, he resigned after a list was posted on his personal website of dozens of sites across Egypt that were looted during the 2011 protests.

Hawass was reappointed Minister of Antiquities by then-Prime Minister Essam Sharaf. On March 30, 2011, a tweet was posted stating "I am very happy to be the Minister of Antiquities once again!" but resigned on July 17, 2011, after Sharaf informed him he would not be continuing in the position. According to opinion report from an Egyptian commentator in The Guardian, Hawass was "sacked".

Claimed discoveries 

As his biography at the National Geographic Explorers webpage notes, he states that he is

Works

Hawass has written and co-written many books relating to Egyptology, including The Curse of the Pharaohs: My Adventures with Mummies, and King Tutankhamun: The Treasures from the Tomb, the latter published to coincide with a major exhibition in the UK. He has also written on Tutankhamun for the bi-monthly, UK-based magazine Ancient Egypt.

Hawass is a regular columnist for Egypt Today magazine, and the online historical community Heritage Key. He has narrated several videos on Egyptology, including a series on Tutankhamun.

Appearances

Hawass has appeared on television specials on channels such as the National Geographic Channel, the History Channel and the Discovery Channel. Hawass has also appeared in several episodes of the U.S. television show Digging for the Truth, discussing mummies, the pyramids, Tutankhamun, Cleopatra, and Ramesses II. He also appeared on Unsolved Mysteries during a segment on the curse of Tutankhamun's tomb. In 2010, Hawass appeared on a reality-based television show on The History Channel called Chasing Mummies.

Hawass also worked alongside Egyptologist Otto Schaden during the opening of Tomb KV63 in February 2006 – the first intact tomb to be found in the Valley of the Kings since 1922.

In June 2007 Hawass announced that he and a team of experts may have identified the mummy of Hatshepsut, in KV60, a small tomb in the Valley of the Kings. The opening of the sealed tomb was described in 2006 as "one of the most important events in the Valley of the Kings for almost a hundred years."

Hawass was interviewed about his work by Keith Floyd as part of his television series "Floyd around the Med" in the episode "Cairo, Egypt and Aswan to Luxor" (2000).

Hawass hosted and played further creative roles in the documentary Egypt's Ten Greatest Discoveries.

Views

Return of artifacts to Egypt
Hawass has repeatedly spearheaded movements to return many prominent and irregularly taken Ancient Egyptian artifacts back to Egypt from collections in various other countries. Examples of these artifacts include: the Rosetta Stone, the bust of Nefertiti, the Dendera zodiac ceiling painting from the Dendera Temple, the bust of Ankhhaf (the architect of the Khafre Pyramid), the faces of Amenhotep III's tomb at the Louvre Museum, the Luxor Temple's obelisk at the Place de la Concorde, and the statue of Hemiunu.  

In July 2003, the Egyptians requested the return of the Rosetta Stone from the British Museum. Hawass, then serving as Secretary General of the Supreme Council of Antiquities in Cairo, spoke at a press conference saying: "If the British want to be remembered, if they want to restore their reputation, they should volunteer to return the Rosetta Stone because it is the icon of our Egyptian identity." Referring to Egyptian antiquities at the British Museum, Hawass said, "These are Egyptian monuments. I will make life miserable for anyone who keeps them."

Alex Joffe of the Wall Street Journal expressed the opinion that the looting of antiquities during the 2011 Egyptian revolution made Hawass' campaign to return Egyptian antiquities to Egypt "misguided or at least poorly timed."

In 2019, Hawass relaunched his restitution campaign, asking the Berlin State Museums, the British Museum and the Musée du Louvre: “How can you refuse to lend to the new Grand Egyptian Museum when you have taken so many antiquities from Egypt?" All three museums refused his loan requests.

In 2022, Hawass launched another petition, calling once again on the British Museum to return the Rosetta Stone, the bust of Nefertiti, and the Dendera Zodiac ceiling to Egypt. He planned on sending the petition, signed by a group of Egyptian intellectuals, to European museums in October.

DNA testing of Egyptian mummies

Hawass has been skeptical of the DNA testing of Egyptian mummies; "From what I understand," he has said, "it is not always accurate and it cannot always be done with complete success when dealing with mummies. Until we know for sure that it is accurate, we will not use it in our research."

In December 2000, a joint team from Waseda University in Japan and Cairo's Ain Shams University tried to get permission for DNA testing of Egyptian mummies, but was denied by the Egyptian Government. Hawass stated at the time that DNA analysis was out of the question because it would not lead to anything.

In February 2010, Hawass and his team announced that they had analyzed the mummies of Tutankhamun and ten other mummies and said that the king could have died from a malaria infection that followed a leg fracture. German researchers Christian Timmann and Christian Meyer have cast doubt on this theory, suggesting other possible alternatives for Tutankhamun's cause of death.

In 2012, a study signed by Hawass disclosed that Ramses III may have had a haplogroup that is associated with the Bantu expansion and is the most dominant in Sub-Saharan Africa, E1b1a.

Controversies

Relationships with other archaeologists
Hawass has been accused of domineering behaviour, forbidding archaeologists to announce their own findings, and courting the media for his own gain after they were denied access to archaeological sites because, according to Hawass, they were too amateurish. A few, however, have said in interviews that some of what Hawass has done for the field was long overdue. Hawass has typically ignored or dismissed his critics, and when asked about it he indicated that what he does is for the sake of Egypt and the preservation of its antiquities.

Views on Jews and Israel
Hawass has been a long-standing opponent of normalised relations between Israel and Egypt. In January 2009 Hawass wrote in Asharq Al-Awsat that "The concept of killing women, children, and elderly people ... seems to run in the blood of the Jews of Palestine" and that "the only thing that the Jews have learned from history is methods of tyranny and torment—so much so that they have become artists in this field." He explained that he was not referring to the Jews' "[original] faith" but rather "the faith that they forged and contaminated with their poison, which is aimed against all of mankind." In an interview on Egyptian television in April 2009 Hawass stated that "although Jews are few in number, they control the entire world" and commented on the "control they have" of the American economy and the media. He later wrote that he was using rhetoric to explain political fragmentation among the Arabs and that he does not believe in a "Jewish conspiracy to control the world".

Aftermath of 2011 protests
Criticism of Hawass, in Egypt and more broadly, increased following the protests in Egypt in 2011. On July 12, 2011, The New York Times reported on a story on page A1 that Hawass receives an honorarium each year "of as much as $200,000 from National Geographic to be an explorer-in-residence even as he controls access to the ancient sites it often features in its reports." The Times also reported that he has relationships with two American companies that do business in Egypt.

On April 17, 2011, Hawass was sentenced to jail for one year for refusing to obey a court ruling relating to a contract for the gift shop at the Egyptian Museum to a company with links to Hawass. The ruling was appealed and this specific sentence was suspended pending appeal. The following day, the National Council of Egypt's Administrative Court issued a decree to overturn the court's original ruling, specifying that he would serve no jail time, and would instead remain in his position as Minister of Antiquities. The jail sentence was lifted after a new contract was solicited for the running of the gift shop.

Association with Mubarak
As Minister of Antiquities, Hawass was closely associated with the government of former President Hosni Mubarak. His resignation as minister on March 3, 2011, and his re-appointment to the Ministry on March 30, 2011, have been seen as part of the overall events surrounding Mubarak's resignation. It was reported that his re-appointment angered numerous factions, who opposed the appointment of any of the old guard under Mubarak to new positions in the government. The 2011 Egyptian protests resulted in increased criticism of Hawass. Demonstrators called for his resignation, and the upheaval increased attention on his relationship with the Mubarak family and the way in which he has increased his public profile in recent years.

Commercial endeavours
Hawass has lent his name to a line of men's apparel, described by The New York Times as "a line of rugged khakis, denim shirts and carefully worn leather jackets that are meant, according to the catalog copy, to hark "back to Egypt’s golden age of discovery in the early 20th century"; the clothing was first sold at Harrods department store in London, in April 2011. Critics say the Hawass clothing commercializes Egyptian history, and objected to their understanding that "models had sat on or scuffed priceless ancient artifacts during the photo shoot," an accusation that was denied by Hawass and the clothing manufacturers. Hawass already sells a line of Stetson hats reproducing the ones he wears, which "very much resemble" the ones worn by Harrison Ford in the Indiana Jones movies.

Honorary degrees
Hawass has received many honorary degrees. From outside Egypt, he has received honorary doctorates from the University of Pennsylvania (2000), the University of Lisbon (2011), the Chandrakasem Rajabhat University (2011), the New Bulgarian University (2016), the Universidad Católica Santo Domingo (2016), the Universidad San Ignacio de Loyola (2017) and the Russian State University for the Humanities (2021).

Recognition and awards
Hawass is the recipient of the Egyptian state award of the first degree for his work in the Sphinx restoration project. In 2001, he was silver medallist offered by the Russian Academy of Natural Sciences. In 2002, he was awarded the American Academy of Achievement's Golden Plate and the glass obelisk from US scholars for his efforts to the protection and preservation of Ancient Egyptian monuments. In 2003, Hawass was given international membership in the Russian Academy for Natural Sciences (RANS), and in 2006, he was chosen as one of the world's 100 most influential people by Time magazine. In 2015, He awarded the Golden Memorial Medal of Charles University. In 2018, he was awarded by the Academia Brasileira de Letras for being the only archaeologist who wrote more than 30 books. In the same year, he received the Presidential Medal of the Republic of Kosovo in recognition for his entire academic output. Also in 2018, he received the grand prize of the Saudi Arabia Ministry of Culture. In 2022, he received the plaque of honour from the Faculty of Economics and Political Sciences of Cairo.

Honours

:  Second Class of the National Order of Merit (Algeria)
: Grand Decoration of Honour in Silver with Star of the Decoration of Honour for Services to the Republic of Austria
: Grand Cordon of the Order of Merit (Egypt)
: Officier of the Ordre des Arts et des Lettres
: Commander of the Order of Merit of the Italian Republic
: Gold and Silver Star of the Order of the Rising Sun
: Grand Cross of the Order of the Sun of Peru
: Silver Medal for Merit to Culture – Gloria Artis
: Knight of the Order of Arts and Letters of Spain

Main publications

See Zahi Hawass bibliography for a comprehensive list.
 The Great Book of Ancient Egypt: In the Realm of the Pharaohs, London, ed. White Star, 2018
 Giza and the pyramids, London, ed. Thames & Hudson Ltd, 2017
 Scanning the pharaohs: CT imaging of the New Kingdom royal mummies, Cairo, ed. American University in Cairo Press, 2016
 Newly : Discovered statues from Giza (1990-2009), Cairo, ed. Ministry of Culture, 2011
 Highlights of the Egyptian Museum, Cairo, ed. The American University in Cairo Press, 2011
 Inside the Egyptian Museum, Cairo, ed. he American University in Cairo Press, 2010
 Life in Paradise: The Noble Tombs of Thebes, Cairo, ed. American University in Cairo Press, 2009
 King Tutankhamun: The Treasures of the Tomb, Thames & Hudson, 2008
 Old Kingdom Pottery from Giza, Cairo, ed. Ministry of Culture, 2008
 The Royal Tombs of Egypt: The Art of Thebes Revealed, Thames & Hudson, 2006
 Mountains of the Pharaohs: A History of the Pyramids of Egypt, New York, ed. Doubleday Books, 2006
 Tutankhamun and the Golden Age of the Pharaohs: A Souvenir Book, London, ed. National Geographic Society, 2005
 Tutankhamun : The Mystery of the Boy King, London, ed. National Geographic Society, 2005 
 The Island of Kalabsha, Cairo, ed. American University in Cairo Press, 2005
 How The Great Pyramid Was Built, Washington, D.C., ed. Smithsonian Books, 2004
 Curse of the Pharaohs: My Adventures With Mummies, London, ed. National Geographic Society, 2004
 Hidden Treasures of Ancient Egypt: Unearthing the Masterpieces of Egyptian History, London, ed. National Geographic Society, Londres, 2004
 The Golden Age of Tutankhamun: Divine Might and Splendor in the New Kingdom, Cairo, ed. American University in Cairo Press, 2004 
 Cradle & Crucible: History and Faith in the Middle East, avec David Fromkin et Milton Viorst, London, ed. National Geographic Society, 2004 
 Tesoros de las Piramides, Washington, D.C., ed. Grupo Oceano, 2004
 The Treasures of the Pyramids, London, ed. White Star, 2003
 Egyptian Museum Collections Around the World: Studies for the Centennial of the Egyptian Museum, Cairo, ed. American University in Cairo Press, 2003
 Secrets from the Sand: My Search for Egypt's Past, New York, ed. Harry N. Abrams, 2003
 Bibliotheca Alexandrina: The Archaeology Museum, Cairo, ed. American University in Cairo Press, 2003
 Egyptology at the Dawn of the Twenty-First Century: History, Religion : Proceedings of the Eighth International, Cairo, ed. American University in Cairo Press, 2003
 Hidden Treasures of the Egyptian Museum: One Hundred Masterpieces Form the Centennial Exhibition, Cairo, ed. American University in Cairo Press, 2003
 Fantasy Literature for Children and Young Adults (with Pamela S. Gates), Washington, D.C., ed. Scarecrow Press, 2003
 The Mysteries of Abu Simbel: Ramesses II and the Temples of the Rising Sun, Cairo, ed. American University in Cairo Press, 2001
 Valley of the Golden Mummies: The Greatest Egyptian Discovery Since Tutankhamun, London, ed. Virgin Books, 2000
 The Egyptian Monuments: Problems and Solutions, Berlin, ed. Gruyter, 1995
 Silent Images: Women in Pharaonic Egypt, Cultural Development Fund, Ministry of Culture, 1995
 The funerary establishments of Khufu, Khafra and Menkaura during the Old Kingdom, Pennsylvania, ed. University of Pennsylvania, 1987

Further reading

References

External links

 
 
 
 
 
 
 Biography at the Minnesota State University
 The king of the pharaohs, Tim Radford, The Guardian, November 27, 2003
 Interview with Dr. Zahi Hawass, Director of the Pyramids, Pyramid on PBS NOVA
 Egypt's man from the past who insists he has a future, Jack Shenker in Cairo, The Guardian, May 19, 2011
 Art Zulu Zahi Hawass page
 The Rise and Fall and Rise of Zahi Hawass, Joshua Hammer, Smithsonian magazine, June 2013
 Zahi Hawass supports petition to repatriate rosetta stone and other antiquities, Egypt Independent, February 14, 2023
 Egypt: Hidden corridor in Great Pyramid of Giza seen for first time, BBC World News, March 2, 2023
 Egypt unveils hidden tunnel inside in Giza pyramids, Egyptian Streets, March 4, 2023
 The search for Nefertiti: How close is Zahi Hawass to discovering the queen's mummy?, Egypt Today, September 19, 2022
 Zahi Hawass discusses secret passage in Khufu Pyramid, Egypt Independent, March 4, 2023
 ‘We are now searching for Imhotep’s tomb in Saqqara, Queen Nefertiti’s in Luxor: Zahi Hawass, Daily News Egypt, October 9, 2022

1947 births
Living people
Alexandria University alumni
Cairo University alumni
University of Pennsylvania alumni
Egyptian archaeologists
Egyptian Egyptologists
Antiquities ministers of egypt
Academic staff of The American University in Cairo
University of California, Los Angeles faculty
Art and cultural repatriation
People of the Egyptian revolution of 2011
Egyptian Museum
Egyptian Muslims
Recipients of the Decoration of Honour for Services to the Republic of Austria
Recipients of the Order of Merit (Egypt)
Commandeurs of the Ordre des Arts et des Lettres
Commanders of the Order of Merit of the Italian Republic
Recipients of the Order of the Rising Sun
Grand Crosses of the Order of the Sun of Peru
Recipients of the Silver Medal for Merit to Culture – Gloria Artis
Order of Arts and Letters of Spain recipients
Fulbright alumni
21st-century Egyptian politicians
Egyptians got it Order of the Rising Sun